The 14th Ohio Infantry Regiment was an infantry regiment in the Union Army during the American Civil War.

Service

Three-months regiment
The 14th Ohio Infantry Regiment was organized at Toledo, Ohio, on April 25, 1861, under Colonel James Blair Steedman in response to President Lincoln's call for 75,000 volunteers.  The regiment moved to Cleveland, Ohio, April 25, then to Columbus, Ohio, May 22. Left Ohio for western Virginia May 27. Moved to Clarksburg May 29, and to Phillippi June 2. Action at Philippi June 3. Western Virginia Campaign June 6–17. Laurel Hill July 7. Belington July 8. Pursuit of Garnett July 13–17. Carrick's Ford July 13–14. Ordered to Toledo July 22.  The regiment were mustered out August 13, 1861.

Three-years regiment
The 14th Ohio Infantry was reorganized at Toledo on August 14-September 5, 1861, and mustered in for three years service.

Attachments

The 14th Ohio Infantry mustered out of service at Louisville, Kentucky, on July 11, 1865.

Detailed service

Casualties
The regiment lost a total of 332 men during service; 5 officers and 141 enlisted men killed or mortally wounded, 1 officer and 185 enlisted men died of disease.

Commanders
 Colonel James Blair Steedman
 Colonel George P. Este - commanded at the battle of Perryville as lieutenant colonel
 Lieutenant Colonel Henry D. Kingsbury - commanded at the battle of Chickamauga

See also
 List of Ohio Civil War units
 Ohio in the Civil War
 Bibliography of Ulysses S. Grant

Notes

References
 Chase, John A. History of the Fourteenth Ohio Regiment, O.V.V.I.: From the Beginning of the War in 1861 to Its Close in 1865 (Toledo, OH:  St. John Printing House), 1881. 
 Dyer, Frederick H. A Compendium of the War of the Rebellion (Des Moines, IA:  Dyer Pub. Co.), 1908.
 Ohio Roster Commission. Official Roster of the Soldiers of the State of Ohio in the War on the Rebellion, 1861–1865, Compiled Under the Direction of the Roster Commission (Akron, OH: Werner Co.), 1886–1895.
 Reid, Whitelaw. Ohio in the War: Her Statesmen, Her Generals, and Soldiers (Cincinnati, OH: Moore, Wilstach, & Baldwin), 1868. 
Attribution

External links
 Ohio in the Civil War: 14th Ohio Volunteer Infantry by Larry Stevens
 14th Ohio Infantry living history organization
 National Flag of the 14th Ohio Infantry (probably used early in the war)
 National flag of the 14th Ohio Volunteer Infantry (probably the 14th Ohio Veteran Volunteer Infantry)
 Regimental flag of the 14th Ohio Veteran Volunteer Infantry

Military units and formations established in 1861
Military units and formations disestablished in 1865
Units and formations of the Union Army from Ohio
1861 establishments in Ohio